Alice Khan (born 5 March 1990) is a Seychellois sprinter. In 2009, she competed in the women's 100 metres at the 2009 World Championships in Athletics held in Berlin, Germany. She did not advance to compete in the quarter-finals.

References

External links 
 

Living people
1990 births
Place of birth missing (living people)
Seychellois female sprinters
World Athletics Championships athletes for Seychelles